The 2014–15 daytime network television schedule for four of the five major English-language commercial broadcast networks in the United States covers the weekday daytime hours from September 2014 to August 2015. The schedule is followed by a list per network of returning series, and any series canceled after the 2013–14 season.

Affiliates fill time periods not occupied by network programs with local or syndicated programming. PBS – which offers daytime programming through a children's program block, PBS Kids – is not included, as its member television stations have local flexibility over most of their schedules and broadcast times for network shows may vary. Also not included are stations affiliated with Fox (as the network does not air a daytime network schedule or network news), MyNetworkTV (as the programming service also does not offer daytime programs of any kind), and Ion Television (as its schedule is composed mainly of syndicated reruns).

Legend

 New series are highlighted in bold.

Schedule
 All times correspond to U.S. Eastern and Pacific Time scheduling (except for some live sports or events). Except where affiliates slot certain programs outside their network-dictated timeslots, subtract one hour for Central, Mountain, Alaska, and Hawaii-Aleutian times.
 Local schedules may differ, as affiliates have the option to pre-empt or delay network programs. Such scheduling may be limited to preemptions caused by local or national breaking news or weather coverage (which may force stations to tape delay certain programs in overnight timeslots or defer them to a co-operated station or digital subchannel in their regular timeslot) and any major sports events scheduled to air in a weekday timeslot (mainly during major holidays). Stations may air shows at other times at their preference.

Monday-Friday

Saturday

Sunday

By network

ABC

Returning series:
ABC World News Tonight
The Chew
General Hospital
Good Morning America
The View
This Week with George Stephanopoluos
 Litton's Weekend Adventure
Jack Hanna's Wild Countdown
Ocean Mysteries with Jeff Corwin
Sea Rescue
The Wildlife Docs
Born to Explore with Richard Wiese

New series:
Litton's Weekend Adventure
Outback Adventures with Tim Faulkner

Not returning from 2013-14
Litton's Weekend Adventure
Expedition Wild (Moved to The CW)

CBS

Returning series:
The Bold and the Beautiful
CBS Evening News
CBS News Sunday Morning
CBS This Morning
Face the Nation
Let's Make a Deal
The Price is Right
The Talk
The Young and the Restless
 CBS Dream Team
Lucky Dog
Dr. Chris Pet Vet
Recipe Rehab
All In with Laila Ali
Game Changers with Kevin Frazier

New series:
CBS Dream Team
The Henry Ford's Innovation Nation with Mo Rocca

Not returning from 2013-14
CBS Dream Team
Jamie's 15-Minute Meals

FOX

Returning series
Weekend Marketplace

New series:
Xploration Station
Xploration Awesome Planet
Xploration Outer Space
Xploration Earth 2050
Xploration Animal Science

The CW

Returning series:
The Bill Cunningham Show

New series:
One Magnificent Morning
Dog Whisperer with Cesar Milan: Family Edition
Calling Dr. Pol
The Brady Barr Experience
Expedition Wild (Moved from ABC)
Rock the Park
Reluctantly Healthy
Dog Town, USA

Not returning from 2013-14
Vortexx
The Adventures of Chuck and Friends  (continued on Discovery Family)
Rescue Heroes
Sonic X
Bolts and Blip
The Spectacular Spider-Man
Justice League Unlimited
Dragon Ball Z Kai
B-Daman Crossfire
Yu-Gi-Oh!
Yu-Gi-Oh! Zexal (continued on Nicktoons and Hulu)
Digimon Fusion (continued on Nicktoons)
Cubix: Robots for Everyone

NBC

Returning series:
Days of Our Lives
Meet the Press
NBC Nightly News
Today
NBC Kids
The Chica Show
Tree Fu Tom
LazyTown
Poppy Cat
Noodle and Doodle

New series:
NBC Kids
Astroblast!
Earth to Luna!
Ruff-Ruff, Tweet and Dave

Not returning from 2013-14
NBC Kids
Pajanimals (continues on Sprout)
Justin Time (continues on Sprout)
Make Way for Noddy (continues on Sprout)
Zou (continues on Sprout)

See also
2014–15 United States network television schedule (prime-time)
2014–15 United States network television schedule (late night)

References

Sources
 
 
 

United States weekday network television schedules
2014 in American television
2015 in American television